Jeremy Thompson (born January 3, 1987 (age 36)) is an Iroquois professional lacrosse player for the Georgia Swarm of the National Lacrosse League, and the Atlas of Premier Lacrosse League. He was a two time Junior College Lacrosse National Champion and was 2nd team All-American at Syracuse University. Jeremy is also a member of the Iroquois men's national lacrosse team with his brothers.

Early life 
Jeremy grew up in the Onondaga Nation, NY, and was one of five children of Doloris and Jerome Thompson. Jeremy and his brothers, Jerome (Hiana), Miles, and Lyle, began playing lacrosse at a very young age due to the spiritual and cultural significance lacrosse has in the Native American community. He attended LaFayette High School outside Syracuse, New York, where he led them to two state championships and became an Under Armour and US Lacrosse All-American.

College 
After high school, Jeremy Thompson went on to attend Onondaga Community College. While he was there, Jeremy helped them win two NJCAA national championships, two Mid-State Conference championships, as well as two Region III championships. In his two seasons at OCC, the Lazers went 31-0 with two undefeated national championship seasons. After his time in Junior College, he attended Syracuse University, nearby to his hometown of Nedrow, NY. His first season at Syracuse, he was a USILA Second Team All-American and was All Big East. His senior season he was Third Team All-American as well as All Big East for the second straight year. His brothers Miles and Lyle both played lacrosse at the University of Albany with their cousin Ty Thompson. His other brother Jerome (Haina) played with him at Onondaga Community College.

Professional career 
Jeremy Thompson currently plays in both the National Lacrosse League and Premier Lacrosse League. In the NLL, he plays for the Georgia Swarm and in PLL, he plays for the Atlas. He started his MLL career on the Florida Launch but was traded with his brother Lyle Thompson to the Chesapeake Bayhawks on March 3, 2017. He signed with the Atlas on June 16 from the waiver wire after playing for the Chaos in the inaugural PLL season.

Thompson has previously played with the Buffalo Bandits, Edmonton Rush, Saskatchewan Rush and Panther City Lacrosse Club. Prior to the 2023 NLL season, he was traded to the Georgia Swarm. This will be the first time he is playing his brothers Lyle and Miles on the same team team in the NLL. They previously played together for the Florida Launch in the MLL. Their brother Hiana currently plays for the Albany FireWolves, but has also previously played for the Georgia Swarm with Lyle and Miles.

MLL 
Reference:

PLL 
Reference:

NLL
Reference:

References

1987 births
Living people
American lacrosse players
Buffalo Bandits players
Edmonton Rush players
Iroquois nations lacrosse players
Native American sportspeople
Onondaga Community College alumni
Onondaga people
Panther City LC players
People from Onondaga, New York
Saskatchewan Rush players
Syracuse Orange men's lacrosse players
Competitors at the 2022 World Games